The National Trust for Nature Conservation (NTNC), previously known as King Mahendra Trust for Nature Conservation is a Nepalese non-governmental organization working in the field of nature conservation.

History 
It was established in 1982 as an autonomous non profit organization by legislative law of Nepal. The founder member-secretary was Dr. Hemanta Raj Mishra. Dr. Mishra played a key role on bringing international donors to support the trust. He was member secretary from 1982 to 1992.

Activities 

NTNC's mission is to conserve nature and natural resources in Nepal while meeting the needs of the people in sustainable way. Geographically, the Trust activities have spread from the sub-tropical plains of Chitwan, Bardiya and Kanchanpur in the lowlands to the Annapurna and Manaslu region of the high Himalayas, including the trans-Himalayan region of Upper Mustang and Manang. 

Currently, the projects of Trust are divided into three geographical areas - the lowland, the mid-hills (Kathmandu Valley) and the high mountains. The Trust’s activities in the lowlands are based in and around the Chitwan National Park, the Bardiya National Park and the Shuklaphanta Wildlife Reserve located in the central, western and far-western development regions of Nepal, through the Biodiversity Conservation Center (BCC) in Chitwan, the Bardiya Conservation Program (BCP) in Bardiya and the Shuklaphanta Conservation Program (SCP) in Kanchanpur. Similarly, the Annapurna Conservation Area Project (ACAP), the Manaslu Conservation Area Project (MCAP) and Gaurishankar Conservation Area Project (GCAP) are three protected areas managed by the Trust in the mountain region. 

The Central Zoo is the only project of the Trust in Kathmandu valley. As a new initiative, the Trust has established an Energy and Climate Change Unit to address the emerging issues of climate change through mitigation and adaptation approach and renewable energy technologies. The Trust has also started work on urban environment conservation with the Bagmati River Conservation Project.

Mission Statement
To promote, conserve and manage nature in all its diversity balancing human needs with the environment on a sustainable basis for posterity - ensuring maximum community participation with due cognizance of the linkages between economics, environment and ethics through a process in which people are both the principal actors and beneficiaries.

Projects 
NTNC is working in different protected areas of Nepal from plains of Terai to High Himalayas. The projects/programs includes
 Annapurna Conservation Area Project ACAP
 Manaslu Conservation Area Project MCAP
 Gaurishankar Conservation Area Project GCAP
 Biodiversity Conservation Centre, Chitwan BCC
 Bardia Conservation Program (BCP)BCP
 Suklaphata Conservation Program SCP
 Parsa Conservation Program PCP
 Central zoo Central Zoo

See also 
 Environmental issues in Nepal

References

External links

Non-profit organisations based in Nepal
1982 establishments in Nepal